Isaak de Graaff (1668 – 5 September 1743) was a Dutch map maker.

He was born in Amsterdam, the son of Abraham de Graaf and Susanna Pietersz Eppingh. His father was in the service of the Dutch East India Company from 1679 until his death in 1714, during which time he authored several standards texts of navigation. Thus Isaak grew up with a good grounding with the principles of navigation and cartography. In  1691, he received a commission to produce ah Atlas of Africa and Asia for the Dutch East India Company, which could then be used by their governing council when considering policy. After this was completed in 1705, he was appointed their official cartographer until his death in 1743.

Isaac de Graaf married Sanderina de Brauw in Utrecht in 1708. They set up home on the Brouwersgracht in Amsterdam.

de Graaf map discovered
In 2015 following the discovery of the wreck of the Diemermeer , further research revealed that one of de Graaf's maps was found in the National Library of Australia. This map was the original ship’s navigational map, an example of a navigational aid of which very few survive. The map was drawn by de Graaf in 1735, shortly before the ship was built. The last voyage of the ship is recorded on the map.

References

1668 births
1743 deaths
17th-century Dutch cartographers
18th-century Dutch cartographers
Scientists from Amsterdam